Tyler Perry's A Madea Christmas may refer to:

A Madea Christmas (musical play), a 2011 stage play
A Madea Christmas (film), a 2013 film